Lucio Godoy (born 1958) is a Spanish-Argentine film composer and music producer.

He lived in Madrid from 1992 to 2013, working as a film ad TV composer, scoring and doing the music production for more than 50 feature films. In 2013, he became the director of the Scoring for Film, Television, and Video Games master's degree program at Berklee College of Music's campus in Valencia, Spain.

His feature film credits include: Fin (Jorge Torregrosa), Blackthorn (Mateo Gil), Un cuento chino, Amador, Los Lunes al sol (Fernando León de Aranoa), Triage (Danis Tanović), Los girasoles ciegos, La educación de las hadas (José Luis Cuerda), Mataharis (Icíar Bollaín), El penalti más largo del mundo, El club de los suicidas (Roberto Santiago), Nacidas para sufrir, Cachorro (Miguel Albaladejo), El corredor nocturno, Las razones de mis amigos, Silencio en la Nieve, (Gerardo Herrero), Intacto (Juan Carlos Fresnadillo), Don't Move (Sergio Castellitto) and El aura (Fabián Bielinsky).

He has also worked as musical producer for other composers' films, including Mar adentro, Los otros (Alejandro Amenábar), Todo sobre mi madre, Carne trémula and La flor de mi secreto (Pedro Almodóvar).

Critical reception
His score for The Education of Fairies (2006) was described as "...delicately-wrought, attractive fare that perfectly complements the mood."

Filmography
 Cenizas a las cenizas (1993)
 Cachorro (1996) a.k.a. Bearcub
 Pintadas (1996)
 El Ramo de flores (1996)
 Sangre ciega (1994)
 Ataque verbal (1999)
 Marta y alrededores (1999) a.k.a. Marta and Surroundings
 Manolito Gafotas (1999) a.k.a. Manolito Four Eyes
 Desire (1999)
 La Primera Noche De mi Vida 1998) a.k.a. The First Night of My Life
 Las Razones de mis amigos (2000) a.k.a. Friends Have Reasons
 Carretera y manta (2000) a.k.a. To the End of the Road
 Intacto (2001) a.k.a. Intact
 Mujeres en un Tren (2001) a.k.a. Women in a Train
 El Cielo abierto (2001) a.k.a. Ten Days Without Love
 Carlos contra el mundo (2002) a.k.a. Carlos Against the World
 Los Lunes al sol (2002) a.k.a. Mondays in the Sun
 Rencor (2002) a.k.a. Rancour
 EL Lugar donde estuvo el paraíso (2002) a.k.a. The Place That Was Paradise
 El lápiz del carpintero (2003)
 El Principio de Arquímedes (2004) a.k.a. The Archimedes Principle
 Non ti muovere (2004) a.k.a. Don't Move
 Cachorro (2004) a.k.a. Bear Cub
 Melissa P. (2005)
 El Aura (2005) a.k.a. The Aura
 Heroína (2005)
 Hermanas (2005)
 Manchas (2005)
 Películas para no dormir: Regreso a Moira (2006) (TV)
 Los aires difíciles (2006) a.k.a. Rough Winds
 Volando voy (2006)
 Blackthorn (2011)
 Un cuento chino (2011) a.k.a. Chinese Takeaway
 Gran Hotel (2011)
 Bakery in Brooklyn (2016)
 Tiempo Después (2018)

References

External links
 
 
 Lucio Godoy Berklee faculty page

Argentine film score composers
Male film score composers
Living people
Place of birth missing (living people)
1958 births
Ciak d'oro winners